Abdul Hamid Mahmud (15 January 1942 – 31 January 2021) was an Indonesian politician who served as Regent of Malang for two periods in 1985–1990 and 1990–1995. He also served as Deputy Governor of East Java for Government and Welfare from 1995 to 2000.

Abdul Hamid died on Sunday, 31 January 2021, at Panti Nirmala Hospital, Malang, at the age of 79 due to heart disease. He was buried with military honors in the family cemetery, which is in the Areng-Areng area, Dau, Malang.

References 

1942 births
2021 deaths
Vice Governors of East Java
Mayors and regents of places in East Java